Maurice O'Kelly was an Irish Roman Catholic clergyman in the 16th century: he was appointed Bishop of Kilfenora in 1514; and died in office in 1541.

References

1541 deaths
Bishops of Kilfenora